The black-legged dacnis (Dacnis nigripes) is a species of bird in the family Thraupidae.
It is endemic to Brazil.

Its natural habitats are subtropical or tropical moist lowland forest and subtropical or tropical moist montane forest.
It is threatened by habitat loss.

References

Dacnis
Birds of the Atlantic Forest
Endemic birds of Brazil
Taxonomy articles created by Polbot
Birds described in 1856
Taxa named by August von Pelzeln